Brenda Nokuzola Fassie (3 November 1964 – 9 May 2004) was a South African singer, songwriter, dancer and activist. Affectionately called MaBrrr by her fans, she is also known as the "Queen of African Pop", the "Madonna of The Townships" or simply as The Black Madonna. Her bold stage antics earned a reputation for "outrageousness"; ironically, her Xhosa name, Nokuzola, means "quiet", "calm", or "peace".

Biography 
Brenda Nokuzola Fassie was born in Langa, Cape Town on 3 November 1964, the youngest of nine children. She was named after the American singer Brenda Lee. Her father died when she was only two years old; with the help of her mother, a pianist, she soon started earning money by singing for tourists.

When she was 16 years old in 1981, she received a visit by Hendrick "Koloi" Lebona. As a result, she left Cape Town for Soweto, Johannesburg, to seek her fortune as a singer. Fassie first joined the vocal group Joy (filling in for one of the members who was on maternity leave) and later became the lead singer for a township music group called Brenda and the Big Dudes. She had a son, Bongani, in 1985 by a fellow Big Dudes musician. She married Nhlanhla Mbambo in 1989, but the pair divorced in 1991. Around this time she became addicted to cocaine and her career suffered as a result.

With very outspoken views and frequent visits to the poorer townships of Johannesburg, as well as songs about life in the townships, Fassie enjoyed tremendous popularity. She also used her music to oppose the apartheid regime in South Africa. In 1989, she released the song "Black President" as a tribute to Nelson Mandela, a political prisoner and later the first Black president of South Africa. Known best for her songs "Weekend Special" and "Too Late for Mama", Fassie was dubbed "The Madonna of the Townships" by Time magazine in 2001.

In 1995, she was discovered in a hotel with the body of her female lover, Poppie Sihlahla, who had died of an apparent overdose. Fassie underwent rehabilitation and got her career back on track. However, she still had drug problems, and returned to drug rehabilitation clinics about 30 times in her life. From 1996 on she released several solo albums, including Now Is the Time, Memeza (1997), and Nomakanjani?. Most of her albums became multi-platinum sellers in South Africa; Memeza was the best-selling album in South Africa in 1998.

Death 
On the morning of 26 April 2004, Fassie collapsed at her home in Buccleuch, Gauteng, and was admitted into a hospital in Sunninghill. The press were initially told that she had suffered cardiac arrest, but later reported that she had slipped into a coma brought on by an asthma attack. The post-mortem report revealed that Fassie had taken an overdose of cocaine on the night of her collapse, and this was the cause of her coma. She stopped breathing and suffered brain damage from lack of oxygen. Fassie was visited in the hospital by Nelson Mandela, Winnie Mandela, and Thabo Mbeki, and her condition was front-page news in South African papers. She died aged 39 on 9 May 2004 in hospital, without regaining consciousness, after her life support machines were turned off. According to the South African Sunday Times and the managers of her music company, the post-mortem report also showed that she was HIV-positive. Her manager, Peter Snyman, denied this aspect of the report. Her family, including her long-term partner, were at her side when she died.

Recognition 
Fassie won five South African Music Awards: Best Female Artist and Song of the Year in 1999, Best-Selling Release of the Decade and Best Song of the Decade in 2004, and Lifetime Achievement Award in 2005. She also won three Kora Awards: Most Promising Female Artist of Africa and Best Female Artist of Africa in 1996, and the Jury Special Award in 2001. She was voted 17th in the Top 100 Great South Africans.

Her son Bongani "Bongz" Fassie performed "I'm So Sorry", a song dedicated to his mother, on the soundtrack to the 2005 Academy Award-winning movie Tsotsi. In March 2006 a life-size bronze sculpture of Fassie by artist Angus Taylor was installed outside Bassline, a music venue in Johannesburg.

Discography 
Most of Fassie's records were issued by the EMI-owned CCP Records.

With The Big Dudes:
 1983: Weekend Special
 1984: Cool Spot (EP)
 1984: Let's Stick Together
 1984: Someone To Love (Maxi)
 1985: Higher and Higher
 1985: Touch Somebody (EP)
 1986: No No Señor

Solo albums:

 1987: Brenda
 1987: Ag Shame Lovey
 1988: Umuntu Ngumuntu Ngabantu
 1989: Too Late for Mama
 1990: Black President
 1991: I Am Not a Bad Girl
 1992: Yo Baby
 1993: Mama
 1994: Abantu Bayakhuluma
 1995: Umuntu Uyashintsha
 1996: Now Is the Time
 1997: Paparazzi
 1998: Memeza
 1999: Nomakanjani
 2000: Thola Amadlozi
 2001: Myekeleni
 2002: Mina Nawe: Ngohlala Ngi Nje
 2003: Mali
 2004: Gimme Some Volume
 2004: Greatest Hits: The Queen of African Pop (1964–2004)

Fassie also contributed to Mandoza's album Tornado (2002), Miriam Makeba's album Sangoma (1988), and Harry Belafonte's anti-apartheid album Paradise in Gazankulu (1988). She sang on two of the soundtrack albums for Yizo Yizo (both released in 2004).

See also

 Afro-pop
 Anti-apartheid music

References 

 Afropop! An Illustrated Guide to Contemporary African Music by Sean Barlow & Banning Eyre. (Book Sales August 1995) ,

External links 

1964 births
2004 deaths
20th-century South African women singers
Anti-apartheid activists
Bisexual singers
Bisexual women
Cocaine-related deaths
Drug-related deaths in South Africa
Kwaito musicians
South African bisexual people
South African LGBT singers
People from Langa, Western Cape
People with HIV/AIDS
Xhosa people
20th-century South African LGBT people
21st-century South African LGBT people